Borna is a town in Saxony, Germany, capital of the Leipzig district. It is situated approximately 30 km southeast of Leipzig city. It has approx. 19,000 inhabitants. The town is the district seat of the district of Leipzig.

Geography
The river Wyhra flows through the town. The surrounding landscape has been influenced by open-cast coal mining.

The town lies in the middle of Central German Metropolitan Region, with Leipzig  distant, Gera , Chemnitz , Halle , and Dresden .

History

Pre-history and Middle Ages
The current site of Borna town was originally two settlements; Altstadt (the old town) and Wenigborn. Before the foundation of the town, there had been a water castle since the 9th Century. The first written mention of the town of Borna was recorded in 1251. Borna was burnt to the ground five times during the wars of the Middle Ages.

19th Century Onwards

Since the early 19th century the landscape around Borna has been shaped by open-cast mining of brown coal (lignite) with an apex in the 1980s. For the last 20 years there have been huge efforts to revegetate this landscape e. g. by flooding opencast pits and creating new lakes as well as planting thousands of trees.

The industrialization of the town coincided with the start of lignite mining around 1800.  The lignite industry was predominant in the region until recently.

Population 
(December 31 each year)

Railway
On January 14, 1867, with the completion of the Borna-Neukieritzsch line,  Borna joined the German railway network. From Neukieritszch the line connected with the Saxon-Bavarian railway line between Leipzig and Hof. This rail connection was financed by a partnership between private concerns and the town and was the only municipal railway in the Kingdom of Saxony. On April 8, 1872 the link was extended via Geithain to Chemnitz, creating the Neukieritzsch–Chemnitz railway.

In October 2007 the 14th century romanesque building of Emmaus Church in Heuersdorf ( from Borna) was cut from the ground and relocated in Martin Luther Square of Borna . The church's journey took a number of days.

Main sights
Kunigunden Church
Emmaus Church on Luther square (moved from nearby Heuersdorf, which was resettled because of an open coal mine in 2008)
Town hall
Secondary school Gymnasium Am Breiten Teich

Gallery

Notable citizens

 Gustav Friedrich Dinter (1760-1831), theologian, educator
 Karl Immanuel Nitzsch (1767-1868), theologian
 Ludwig Otto (1850—1920), artist, was born at Borna
 Clemens Thieme (1861-1945), builder of the Volkerschlacht memorial in Leipzig
 Ludwig Külz (1875-1938), professor of tropical medicine
 Wilhelm Külz (1875-1948), politician (DDP, LDPD), MdR, Minister of the Interior

 Karl Möbius (1876-1953), German sculptor
 Wolfgang Heyl (1921-2014), politician (CDU)
 Horst Pehnert (1932-2013), journalist and party official in the GDR
 Thomas Munkelt (born 1952), athlete, hurdler
 Maic Malchow (born 1962), track cyclist
 Sven Lehmann (1965-2013), actor
 Torsten Jülich (born 1974), soccer player
 Thorsten Görke (born 1976), soccer player
 Steffen Radochla (born 1978), cyclist
 Oliver Herber (born 1981), soccer player

References

External links

Leipzig (district)